Hans Elzerman (born 17 October 1954) is an Olympic swimmer from the Netherlands, and as of early 2011 is a national swimming coach. His sister Josien and brother Henk are also Olympic swimmers.

At the 1972 Olympics, Hans was a member of the Dutch 4x100 and 4x200 freestyle relay teams.

Coaching
In 2001, Hans was one of the coaches who founded the Dutch club Top Zwemmen Amsterdam. Around this time, he was coach to Inge de Bruijn. In 2007, Top Zwemmen became part of the National Swimming Institute of Amsterdam.

References

1954 births
Living people
Dutch male freestyle swimmers
Olympic swimmers of the Netherlands
Swimmers at the 1972 Summer Olympics
Swimmers from The Hague